This is a list of the maximum potential tax rates around Europe for certain income brackets. It is focused on three types of taxes: corporate, individual, and value added taxes (VAT). It is not intended to represent the true tax burden to either the corporation or the individual in the listed country.

Graphs

Summary list 
The quoted income tax rate is, except where noted, the top rate of tax: most jurisdictions have lower rate of taxes for low levels of income. Some countries also have lower rates of corporation tax for smaller companies. In 1980, the top rates of most European countries were above 60%. Today most European countries have rates below 50%.

Per country information: income tax bands

Austria 
Austrian income taxation is determined by §33 of Austrian Income Tax Code (Einkommensteuergesetz - EStG)

Until the end of the year 2020 an additional tax (55%) will affect income of over 1 million €.

Belgium

Croatia

Denmark

Finland

The total Finnish income tax includes the income tax dependable on the net salary, employee unemployment payment, and employer unemployment payment.
The tax rate increases very progressively rapidly at 13 ke/year (from 25% to 48%) and at 29 ke/year to 55% and eventually reaches 67% at 83 ke/year, while little decreases at 127 ke/year to 65%. 
The middle-income person will get 44 euros from every 100 euros the employer puts on the work. 
The GP will then again get from every extra 100 euros that the employer puts on the work only 33 euros. 
Some sources do not include the employer unemployment payment, for instance Veronmaksajat -organisation.

France

Income tax in France depends on the number of people in the household. The taxable income is divided by the number of persons belonging to the household. Each adult counts as one person while the first two children count as half each. From the third child onwards each child counts as one person. Therefore, a household comprising 2 adults and 3 children is considered to be a household of 4 persons for tax purposes.

The rates below do not include the 17% social security contributions.

Germany

German income tax comprises 5 income tax bands, with the first two being based on a totally Progressive tax rate and the rest being flat rate. Taxable income is derived after subtracting personal and child allowances from earned income. In addition a number of other deductions may be claimed by German taxpayers.
Personal allowance: €9,000 per adult
Child allowance: €7,428 per child

In Germany, married couples are taxed jointly. This means that the tax liability for the couple is twice the amount resulting from the tariff when inserting the average income of both spouses. Due to the progressive tariff, filing jointly uniformly reduces the total tax burden if spouses' incomes differ.

Italy

Allowance per child: €1,120

Netherlands

Income tax in the Netherlands (Inkomstenbelasting, Box 1) and social security contributions are combined in one payroll tax. There are no personal tax-free allowances; however, there are personal and labor tax credits that reduce the amount of income tax paid.

Prior to 2020, the income tax was assessed within four brackets, which have been simplified to just three (effectively two) as of 2020. As of 2023, the income tax rates are:

 
Income-dependent deductions and tax credits apply to incomes up to €98,604.

Portugal 
Income tax in Portugal depends on a number of factors, including regional (different tax rates depending if you live in the mainland, the Azores or Madeira regions, marital status and number of dependents.
For simplification purposes, the following is a summary of the major tax brackets.

A solidarity additional tax of 2.5% is applied on income between €80,640 and €250,000. All income above €250,000 is taxed a further 5%.

Spain
Spanish income tax includes a personal tax free allowance and an allowance per child. In 2012 a special temporary surcharge was introduced as part of austerity measures to balance the budget.
The personal allowance currently stands at €5,151.
1st child €1,836 
2nd child  €2,040 
3rd child €3,672 
4th & subs €4,182

United Kingdom

Income tax for the United Kingdom is based on 2019/20 tax bands. The current tax free threshold on earnings is £12,500. The relief is tapered by £1 for every £2 earned over £100,000, resulting in an effective 60% tax rate for incomes between £100,000 and £125,000.

See also
 List of countries by tax revenue as percentage of GDP
 VAT rates
 Tax Freedom Day
 Tax haven
 Tax rates around the world

References

Sources
FITA Country Profiles

External links
The Tax Foundation
VAT Rates Applied in the Member States of the European Union, 1 July 2013, European Commission
Excise duties on alcohol, tobacco and energy, 1 July 2013, European Commission
HM Revenue & Customs: Corporation Tax rates
European VAT Rates

Europe
Economy of Europe